Knockout Reilly is a lost 1927 American silent drama film directed by Malcolm St. Clair and written by Pierre Collings, John W. Conway, and Kenneth Raisbeck based upon a story by Albert Payson Terhune. The film stars Richard Dix, Mary Brian, Jack Renault, Harry Gribbon, Osgood Perkins, and Lucia Backus Seger. The film was released on April 16, 1927, by Paramount Pictures.

Plot
When a successful prizefighter known as "Killer" Agerra causes trouble in a nightclub, a New Jersey mill worker, Dundee Reilly, knocks him out. This impresses both Pat Malone, an ex-boxer, and Pat's attractive sister Mary, who takes a liking to Reilly. Reilly becomes a boxer under Pat's tutelage, but is framed for a crime and ends up serving nearly a year behind bars. When he gets out, Agerra's opponent in an upcoming fight drops out, so Pat Malone arranges for "Knockout" Reilly to be his replacement in the ring. Agerra is much too good for him. Reilly is on the verge of being knocked out when Mary Malone visits his corner and tells him it was Agerra who framed him and caused him to go to jail. A newly motivated Reilly knocks his foe flat.

Cast 

Richard Dix as Dundee 'Knockout' Reilly
Mary Brian as Mary Malone
Jack Renault as Killer Agerra
Harry Gribbon as Pat Malone
Osgood Perkins as Spider Cross
Lucia Backus Seger as Mrs. Reilly
Larry McGrath as Kewpie Dugan
John Merton as Buck Lennard (credited as Myrtland La Varre)
Scotty Devlin as Reilly's Chauffeur
John Dipse as Fighter in Preliminary Bout
Eddie Garvey (unidentified role)
Sailor Gibbs as Fighter at Training Camp
Patsy Haley as Referee
Joe Humphries as Ring Announcer
Ted "Kid" Lewis as Fighter at Training Camp (credited as Kid Lewis)
Tommy McFadden (unidentified role)
Graham McNamee as Radio Reporter
Kid McPartland as Timekeeper
Jack Perry as Fighter at Training Camp
Billy Vidabeck as Fighter at Training camp
George Ward as Fighter in Preliminary Bout
John Burdette as Minor role

References

External links

Stills at The Lost Films Of Richard Dix

1927 films
1920s English-language films
Silent American drama films
1927 drama films
Paramount Pictures films
Films directed by Malcolm St. Clair
American black-and-white films
American silent feature films
Lost American films
1927 lost films
Lost drama films
1920s American films